There were many areas annexed by Germany both immediately before and throughout the course of World War II. Territories that were part of Germany before the annexations were known as the "Altreich" (Old Reich).

Fully annexed territories 

According to the Treaty of Versailles, the Territory of the Saar Basin was split from Germany for at least 15 years. In 1935, the Saarland rejoined Germany in a lawful way after a plebiscite.

The territories listed below are those that were fully annexed into Germany proper.

Partially incorporated territories 

The territories listed below are those that were partially incorporated into the Greater German Reich.

Planned annexations 

In the coming Nazi New Order, other lands were considered for annexation sooner or later, for instance North Schleswig, German-speaking Switzerland, and the zone of intended German settlement in north-eastern France, where a Gau or a Reichskommissariat centred on Burgundy was intended for creation, and which Heinrich Himmler wanted to turn into the SS's very own fiefdom The goal was to unite all or as many as possible ethnic Germans and Germanic peoples, including non-Germanic speaking ones considered "Aryans", in a Greater Germanic Reich.

The eastern Reichskommissariats in the vast stretches of Ukraine and Russia were also intended for future integration into that Reich, with plans for them stretching to the Volga or even beyond the Urals, where the potential westernmost reaches of Imperial Japanese influence would have existed, following an Axis victory in World War II. They were deemed of vital interest for the survival of the German nation, as it was a core tenet of Nazism that Germany needed "living space" (Lebensraum), creating a "pull towards the East" (Drang nach Osten) where that could be found and colonized.

North-East Italy was also eventually to be annexed, including both the Operational Zone of the Adriatic Littoral and the Operational Zone of the Alpine Foothills, but also the Venice region. Goebbels went as far as to suggest taking control of Lombardy as well:

The annexation of the entire North Italy was also suggested in the long run.

See also

Alldeutscher Verband
Blut und Boden
Former eastern territories of Germany
Generalplan Ost
German Question
Heim ins Reich
Ostsiedlung
Pan-Germanism
Recovered Territories
Territorial evolution of Germany
Volk ohne Raum
Volksdeutsche
Wehrbauer

Notes

Aftermath of World War I in Germany
Borders of Germany
Foreign relations of Nazi Germany
German colonial empire
German diaspora in Europe
Pan-Germanism
Germany
Germany
German irredentism
Axis powers